The yellow-scarfed tanager (Iridosornis reinhardti) is a species of bird in the family Thraupidae. It is found in forests in the Andean highlands in Peru.

References

yellow-scarfed tanager
Birds of the Peruvian Andes
Endemic birds of Peru
yellow-scarfed tanager
yellow-scarfed tanager
Taxonomy articles created by Polbot